St Columb Minor Church is a late 15th-century Church of England parish church Diocese of Truro in St Columb Minor, Cornwall, United Kingdom

Site
The site is probably that of an ancient barrow where pagan rites were celebrated, and was originally circular. The position is in full view of the twin tumuli, the symbol of the fruitfulness of Mother Nature. It is sheltered from the strong winds of the Atlantic and looks down the Rialton valley and across at Castle-an-Dinas at the summit of Castle Downs. Here the Celtic missionaries, centuries before the Columba legend arose, drove away the evil spirits and replaced pagan magic by Christian worship, and erected the first wooden sanctuary. The Churchtown lay to the West and South while the shelving ground to the North and East prevented building for all time. Hence, as in the case of so many villages, the houses extended more and more from the parish church.

St Columba
Both St Columb Minor & St Columb Major churches were dedicated to Columba of Cornwall, but there is no written record of this. How the name arose or who St. Columba was is not known. The legend is very like that of St. Columba of Sens and some historians think she may be a French saint. the late Mr. Henderson suggested that St. Crantoc called his companions Columba (doves) and that these churches were named after his missionaries.

The Church Building
The first church was probably replaced more than once, until about 1100 A.D. a Norman church was built. Its outline has been traced from the present chancel step to about a yard from the belfry door, with  North and South walls, exactly where the nave arches stand today. Part of the Norman foundations are to be seen around the pillars. It is possible to picture this old church with small windows, perhaps with transepts, and having a low arch leading to an apse.

About the middle of the twelfth century another church was erected in the place of the Norman one. This had aisles which terminated at the chancel. Nothing is known about the building of this church, The Church was first mentioned in 1283 as a chapelry to the collegiate church of Crantock. The collegiate church were appropriated the parishes of Crantock and St Columb Minor; That same year, Bishop Peter Quinel united the prebends to make a vicarage. During the reformation the Crown grantee was under the obligation of providing curates for Crantock and St. Columb Minor, but the stipend of the latter, having been fixed at £8, was soon rendered quite inadequate by the rise in prices.

In 1417 the Bishop of Exeter stated that the chancel was in a ruinous state and that the church must rebuild at once. The stones used, tell their own story, as does also the style of architecture.
 
About 1430 nave arcades were reconstructed: two of the original pillars of Beer stone were left but the other pillars are of Cornish granite. One baffling question concerns the blocked window near the tower which is Early English but does not accord with the rest of the building.

About 1470 the east walls of both transepts were taken down and the aisles extended to the length of the chancel, the side walls of the chancel being pierced with arcades.

The Tower was built in the fifteenth century. There were three altars, of which something can be learnt from the researches of Dr. W. J. Stephens. The high altar was dedicated to St. Columba and the Blessed Virgin Mary. The north altar was to the Holy Trinity. The south altar was to St. Michael, and stood in front of the screen. The piscenas of these altars were disclosed at the 1886 restoration and are of beer stone.

Woodwork. The screen was destroyed in 1795. A few fragments may be seen in the North aisle. The staircase and passages through the arcades remain. William Hals (1658) gives this description:- “The Rood loft (yet standing though without a rood on it) a most curious and costly piece of workmanship, carved and painted with gold, silver, vermilion and bice, is a masterpiece of art in these parts of that kind.” The church was seated with benches “built by the poor stock in 1595” and had carved ends. They were destroyed in 1795 but one is to be seen in the North aisle.

The Font of Penventon stone was made about 1450 and is a copy of a Norman original.

The Porch with stone benches dates about 1450. The date 1669 was carved over the door-way but was removed at the 1886 restoration.

The Tower, recorded as the second highest in Cornwall, is 115 feet in height. Until recent building on the Newquay  Road it could be seen from nearly every point of the very extensive parish, and far out to sea.

The Royal Arms are of Charles II and are unusually large and finely coloured.

Monuments. The most interesting of the slate slabs placed on the walls are to Elizabeth Pollamounter, the daughter of Richard Pollamounter, Gent: and to Roger Ellery who was registrar during the Commonwealth.

A visitor to the church in 1878 found the church damp with green mould on the pillars and walls, and dry rot everywhere. The churchyard was the most shamefully kept he had ever seen.

Restorations
There have been two “restorations.” In 1795 the screen was cut up for floor boards and the nave and aisles filled with deal box pews for the farmers and a gallery put up at the West end for the labourers. The names of subscribers are painted on a board in the belfry. In 1840 the Lay Rector destroyed the ancient East window and inserted the present “churchy” window. Samples of the Victorian glass from this window hang in the North aisle. The Holy Water Stoup was removed about this time and built into the boundary wall to the East of the chancel.

In 1884 the building was in a deplorable state and another restoration was effected. Unfortunately the restorers did not understand this type of church which having been under a monastic body was all on one level. To make a series of steps to the altar the whole floor of the nave was lowered and the floor of the chancel so raised as to bury the bases of the pillars. The church was seated in pitch pine and a new roof put in. The carved rafters of the aisles were taken from the nave roof, and to make the church perfectly straight the chancel walls which inclined to the South were forced out of shape. The organ was formerly in a private house. The church was reopened on 23 September 1886 with a morning sermon by the Bishop of Truro, George Wilkinson.

Features of the church
The pulpit, a splendid piece of work, was given in 1935 by J. Knight, Esq, of Beachcroft in memory of his daughter. The original stone pulpit was given to Trencreek chapel. The chapel was demolished some time ago and the original pulpit has now been lost.

An oak altar table has been given by Mrs Stephens and Dr Stephens in memory of Mr Alexander Stephens who was Churchwarden for many years. Let into the mensa is the Portable Altar, which dates from 1415 and is in perfect condition: there are very few other examples of such an altar.

The clock was given in 1910 in memory of the Reverend A Langford. From the record of the installation of the church clock that it was dedicated by the Vicar on 4 November 1910, and started at exactly three o’clock, when we are told “The sweetness of the chimes was noted by all with delight”. On the face of the clock appear the arms of the Langford family. The appearance of the clock is described as being in accordance with the oldest known examples of such clocks, as seen at Hexham Abbey, and Kirkbampton and Castle Rushen in the Isle of Man.

There is a peal of eight bells.

See also

 St Columba's Church, St Columb Major

References

The St. Columb Minor Parish and Church History and Calendar blotter of 1939–40

External links

Parish website

St Columb Minor
St Columb Minor
St Columb Minor